457th may refer to:

457th Air Expeditionary Group, provisional United States Air Force unit assigned to the Air Combat Command
457th Airlift Squadron (457 AS), part of the 375th Airlift Wing at Andrews Air Force Base, Maryland
457th Fighter Squadron, United States Air Force Reserve Command (AFRC) unit, assigned to the 301st Operations Group

See also
457 (number)
457 (disambiguation)
457, the year 457 (CDLVII) of the Julian calendar
457 BC